10,000 Days is the eighteenth studio album by Canadian band Saga. It was recorded after Michael Sadler had explained that he would leave the band for family reasons. The title therefore alludes to the thirty years Sadler had been part of Saga (which equates roughly 10,000 days). Sadler left after the tour but would return to the fold four years later.

"Corkentellis" is the first full-band instrumental Saga ever recorded ("Conversations" had some lines sung through a vocoder, whereas "Voila!" and "Watching the Clock" were solo piano interludes by Jim Gilmour). The track's unusual title is an amalgam of the names of three former Saga managers - Clive Corcoran, Geoff Kent and Michael Ellis. Along with "Book of Lies", it has become a live favourite.

Track listing

Personnel
 Michael Sadler – vocals, keyboards
 Ian Crichton – guitars
 Jim Crichton – bass, keyboards
 Jim Gilmour – keyboards, vocals
 Brian Doerner – drums

Production
 Recorded and Engineered by Saga
 Drums Recorded and Engineered by Mark Fortuna
 Mixed by Jim Crichton
 Mastered by Peter van't Riet
 Produced by Saga
 Illustrations by Warren Flanagan. Graphic Design by Patrick Zahorodniuk

References

2007 albums
Saga (band) albums
SPV/Steamhammer albums
Inside Out Music albums